McDonald's France, colloquially called McDo,  is the French subsidiary of the international fast food restaurant chain McDonald's. Its first location opened in 1972 by franchisee Raymond Dayan in Creteil, France, although the company itself still recognizes the first outlet as opening in Strasbourg in 1979. McDonald's France currently has over 1,485 restaurants operating nationwide, serving an estimated forty-six million people each week.

McDonald's French operations are based in Guyancourt, Yvelines.

Menu 
As with McDonald's locations worldwide, the franchise primarily sells hamburgers, cheeseburgers, chicken, french fries, breakfast items, soft drinks, milkshakes and desserts. In response to changing consumer tastes, the company has expanded its menu to include salads, fish, wraps, smoothies, and fruit. The company also operates the McCafé chain within many of its stores. McDonald’s in France is known for its pastries such as  croissants, doughnuts, pain au chocolat, and macarons. There is also a McBaguette, introduced in 2012, filled with two burger patties, two slices of Emmental cheese, lettuce, and French mustard. It is typically offered seasonally and resurged in popularity in 2022 after being featured in the TV series Emily in Paris.

Technology 

In 2016, in what U.S. media described as "McDonald's of the future," over 90% of McDonald's France had self-ordering touchscreen kiosks.  McDonald's France smartphone app, GoMcDo, built by AirTag, was one of the first in France to offer integration with Apple's Passbook.

References

Fast-food chains of France
Fast-food hamburger restaurants
McDonald's subsidiaries
Restaurants established in 1972
French companies established in 1972
French subsidiaries of foreign companies